Verich is a surname. Notable people with the surname include:

Chris Verich, American politician
Michael G. Verich, American politician, brother of Chris